Piers Adams (born 21 December 1963) is a British recorder player and member of baroque group Red Priest.

After attending Reading Blue Coat School Adams trained as a physicist at the University of Bristol, but turned professionally to the recorder at age 21.   Known as the "modern day pied piper" his performing career has taken him all over the world to places such as the USA, Canada, Australia, New Zealand, China, Japan, Russia and most European countries.

Adams has received numerous awards for his recorder playing, including first prize in the inaugural Moeck International Recorder Competition (1985) which led to debuts in the premier London venues such as the Wigmore Hall and Royal Festival Hall.

As a concert soloist, Adams performs with orchestras including the BBC Symphony Orchestras, the Philharmonia, the Academy of Ancient Music, Guildhall Strings, the English Sinfonia, the City of London Sinfonia, London Musici and the Singapore Symphony Orchestra.

CD recordings range from his award-winning debut of Vivaldi Concertos (Cala) to David Bedford's heroic Recorder Concerto (NMC) – one of many major works written for him.   CDs available include Recorder Bravura (romantic showpieces), Shine and Shade (20th century sonatas) and seven Red Priest CDs: Priest on the Run, Nightmare in Venice, The Four Seasons, Pirates of the Baroque, Johann, I'm Only Dancing, Handel in the wind and Baroque Bohemians, which reached No.1 in the UK Specialist Classical Charts in October 2018.  In 2019 Adams recorded a baroque new-age crossover album, Bach Side of the Moon, which reached No. 5 in the international New Age Music charts.

Adams' current projects include an innovative recorder and synth duo, Baroque Alchemy, with his keyboardist partner Lyndy Mayle.

References

External links
 Piers Adams website
 Red Priest website
 Upbeat Classical Management

1963 births
Living people
British classical musicians
British recorder players
British performers of early music
Factory Records artists
People educated at Reading Blue Coat School
Albany Records artists